Peterloo is a 2018 British historical drama, written and directed by Mike Leigh, based on the Peterloo Massacre of 1819. The film was selected to be screened in the main competition section of the 75th Venice International Film Festival. The film received its UK premiere on 17 October 2018, as part of the BFI London Film Festival, at HOME in Manchester. The screening marked the first time that the festival had held a premiere outside London. Leigh said he was delighted that Peterloo would be premiered "where it happened".

It was released in the United Kingdom on 2 November 2018, by Entertainment One and in the United States on 5 April 2019, by Amazon Studios.

Background 
The film Peterloo marks the 200th anniversary of the notorious Peterloo Massacre. On 16 August 1819, a crowd of some 60,000 people from Manchester and surrounding towns gathered in St Peter's Fields to demand Parliamentary reform and an extension of voting rights. At that time, Manchester had no members of parliament of its own while the whole of Lancashire was represented by two county MPs.

The meeting had been peaceful but, in the attempt to arrest a leader of the meeting, the armed government militias panicked and charged upon the crowd. The toll of casualties has always been disputed but as many as 18 people were killed and up to 700 wounded. The immediate effect of the massacre was a crackdown on reform, as the government feared that the country was heading towards armed rebellion. The outcry led to the founding of the Manchester Guardian and played a significant role in the passage through Parliament of the Great Reform Act.

Plot
After the Battle of Waterloo, Joseph returns home from service in the Duke of Wellington's army to Manchester and his close-knit family headed by parents Joshua and Nellie. Joshua, son Robert, daughter Mary, and daughter-in-law Esther all earn a living by manual labour in a cotton mill. An economic depression makes work impossible for the traumatised Joseph to find and threatens the family's livelihood. The family is sympathetic to the radical campaigns for equal civil and political rights for all free men and against the Corn Laws that prevent them from buying cheaper imported grain. Joshua, Joseph, and Robert attend political meetings where local agitators including John Knight, Samuel Bamford and John Bagguley speak out against the system of government; Nellie attends a meeting of the Manchester Female Reform Society. The local authorities, led by magistrates Colonel Fletcher, Reverend William Robert Hay, Reverend Charles Ethelston and Mr. Norris and Deputy Chief Constable Nadin, spy on the movement and wait for an excuse to arrest its leaders. The Home Secretary, Lord Sidmouth, is determined to suppress radical politics. When a disgruntled Londoner smashes the window of the Prince Regent's coach, Sidmouth uses this as a pretext for suspending habeas corpus.

Bamford and his friend Joseph Healey travel south to London to hear the famous radical Henry 'Orator' Hunt speak at a political meeting. Hunt has a reputation for vanity but Bamford persuades Manchester businessman Joseph Johnson to invite Hunt to address a mass meeting at St Peter's Fields;  the Home Office discovers this invitation by intercepting Johnson's letter. Arriving at Manchester, Hunt goes into hiding in Johnson's home. Richards, a Home Office spy, is able to provoke Bagguley and fellow radicals Drummond and Johnston into publicly calling for armed insurrection, leading to their arrest and imprisonment. The magistrates plan to suppress Hunt's meeting and make an example of the attendees using the local mounted militia, the Manchester and Salford Yeomanry and a regular army detachment led by General John Byng. Hunt remains certain that he can lead a peaceful rally and sidelines Bamford, when he warns of the likelihood of brutal treatment by the authorities.

On the day of the meeting, thousands of people march into Manchester from the surrounding towns to hear Hunt speak at St Peter's Fields, including Nellie and Joshua and their family. Bamford leads a procession from Middleton but leaves in disgust on finding that it has been arranged that only Hunt will be allowed to address the crowd.  A special committee of magistrates has been assembled to take charge of events, chaired by Mr. Hulton. They appear to be in an upstairs room overlooking the gathering crowd. Norris, who urges restraint at least until any rioting might start, is overruled. Byng has left his deputy in command of the soldiers, to attend a genteel horse racing meet.

Once Hunt begins to speak, Reverend Ethelston reads the Riot Act to the crowd. Although the crowd pays no attention to Ethelston, the magistrates are now legally empowered to disperse the meeting. The Yeomanry cavalry assault the peaceful assembly with sabres drawn, while Hunt and Johnson are arrested by Nadin's men. The army tries to clear St Peter's Fields but in the mayhem, the crowd is unable to escape before several people are killed and many more injured. Joseph is wounded with a sabre and later dies. The attending reporters furiously return to their newspapers to expose this atrocity, coining a mocking name for it, "The Massacre of Peterloo". Despite the massacre, the Prince Regent sends his congratulations to the magistrates for suppressing radicalism and restoring "tranquility".

Cast

 Rory Kinnear as Henry Hunt
 Maxine Peake as Nellie
 Pearce Quigley as Joshua
 David Moorst as Joseph
 Rachel Finnegan as Mary
 Tom Meredith as Robert
 Simona Bitmate as Esther
 Robert Wilfort as Lord Liverpool the Prime Minister
 Karl Johnson as Lord Sidmouth the Home Secretary
 Sam Troughton as Mr. Hobhouse
 Roger Sloman as Mr. Grout
 Kenneth Hadley as Mr. Golightly
 Tom Edward-Kane as Mr. Cob
 Lizzy McInnerny as Mrs. Moss
 Alastair Mackenzie as General Sir John Byng
 Neil Bell as Samuel Bamford
 Lisa Millett as Jemima Bamford
 Philip Jackson as John Knight
 John Paul Hurley as John Thacker Saxton
 Tom Gill as Joseph Johnson
 Lizzie Frain as Mrs. Johnson
 Harry Hepple as James Wroe
 Ian Mercer as "Dr" Joseph Healey
 Adam Long as Wroe's Printer
 Nico Mirallegro as John Bagguley
 Danny Kirrane as Samuel Drummond
 Johnny Byrom as John Johnston
 Victor McGuire as Deputy Chief Constable Nadin
 Stephen Wight as Oliver the spy
 Ryan Pope as Chippendale the spy
 Dorothy Atkinson as Singing weaver
 Tim McInnerny as the Prince Regent
 Marion Bailey as Lady Conyngham
 Vincent Franklin as Magistrate Rev. Ethelston
 Jeff Rawle as Magistrate Rev. Hay
 Eileen Davies as Mrs. Hay
 Philip Whitchurch as Magistrate Col. Fletcher
 Martin Savage as Magistrate Norris
 Al Weaver as Magistrate Hulton
 David Bamber as Magistrate Rev. Mallory
 David Fielder as Magistrate Rev. Gutteridge
 Fine Time Fontayne as Magistrate Clowes
 Robert Gillespie as Magistrate Warmley
 Jonathan Jaynes as Magistrate Tatton
 Nicholas Lumley as Magistrate Rev. Perryn
 Shaun Prendergast as Magistrate Bolt
 Alan Williams as Magistrate Marriott
 Dorothy Duffy as Mary Fildes
 Victoria Moseley as Susannah Saxton
 Christine Bottomley as Female reformer
 Samantha Edwards as Female reformer
 Julie Hesmondhalgh as Female reformer
 Kate Rutter as Female reformer
 Katie West as Female reformer
 Joseph Kloska as Richard Carlile
 Leo Bill as John Tyas
 Brian Fletcher as Edward Baines
 Gary Cargill as John Smith
 Patrick Kennedy as Colonel L'Estrange
 Guy Williams as Lieutenant Col. Dalrymple
 Michael Chadwick as 15th Hussar
 Tristram Davies as 15th Hussar
 Oliver Devoti as 15th Hussar
 Dan Poole as 15th Hussar
 Charlie Tighe as 15th Hussar
 Ben Crompton as Tuke, the painter
 Bryony Miller as Bessie
 Lee Boardman as Nadin's Constable
 Steve Garti as Nadin's Constable
 Michael Culkin as a Lord
 Rachel Davies as Pie buyer
 Kieran O'Brien as Farrier
 Noreen Kershaw as Drunken servant
 Bob Goody as Outraged reformer
 Debbie Harding as Quizzical lady

Production
Filming began in May 2017. Production shot the interior of the Tarred Yarn Store in Plymouth, Devon,  and the exterior of the Ropery at the Chatham Historic Dockyard in Kent to double as a cotton mill in Manchester. St Mary's Marshes on the Isle of Grain also appears in a short scene at the beginning of the film, when a lonely figure is seen walking along the marshes.

Much of the dialogue is in traditional Lancashire dialect.  To achieve this, the director used the book The Dialects of South Lancashire, which was written by the same Samuel Bamford who is portrayed in the film.

Reception
The website's critical consensus reads, "Peterloo proves writer-director Mike Leigh's populist anger remains undimmed – but that righteous fury occasionally overpowers the narrative." Metacritic gives the film a weighted average score of 66 out of 100, based on 34 critics, indicating "generally favorable reviews". The New York Times called it a "brilliant and demanding film".

The film obtained no BAFTA nominations for not meeting BAFTA's diversity requirements, and in this regard The Guardian’s critic noted: "Peterloo marks a rare failure for Film4".

See also 
 Sharpe's Justice

References

External links 
 Peterloo at the British Film Institute
 
 
INSIDE military technical advising on Peterloo and Vanity Fair with Paul Biddiss

2018 films
2010s historical films
Films directed by Mike Leigh
Amazon Studios films
Entertainment One films
Film4 Productions films
Films set in Manchester
Films shot in Devon
Films shot in Kent
Films set in 1819
British historical films
Peterloo massacre
Films shot in Greater Manchester
2010s English-language films
2010s British films